Acacia cremiflora, is a small wattle plant occurring in parts of inland New South Wales. It may be seen growing near Orange and Yerranderie. It was first collected on 15 May 1972. The attractive yellow or cream flowers may appear at any time of the year.

Description
It is often composed of five to six main branches diverging at the base of the plant. The branches are erect or arched and split into ribbed, brown to green, smooth, hairy branchlets.

Taxonomy
The species was first formally described by the botanists Barry John Conn and Terrence Michael Tame in 1996 as part of the work A revision of the Acacia uncinata group (Fabaceae-Mimosoideae) as published in the journal Australian Systematic Botany. It was reclassified as Racosperma cremiflorum in 2003 by Leslie Pedley then transferred back to genus Acacia in 2006.

Distribution
The shrub is endemic to inland parts of New South Wales from around Uarby and Elong Elong in the north down to around Mudgee and Yerranderie in the south and extending as far west as Parkes. The more northern populations are mostly situated in woodlands and open woodland-grassland communities growing in stony clayey loamy soils whereas populations in the south are part of Eucalyptus woodlands growing in gravelly clay or sandy loam soils.

See also
 List of Acacia species

References

cremiflora
Fabales of Australia
Flora of New South Wales
Plants described in 1996
Taxa named by Barry John Conn